Barumini is a comune (municipality) in the Province of South Sardinia in the Italian region of  Sardinia, located about  north of Cagliari and about  northeast of Sanluri.

Barumini borders the following municipalities: Gergei, Gesturi, Las Plassas, Tuili, Villanovafranca.

It is home to Su Nuraxi di Barumini, a Nuraghe complex listed in the UNESCO World Heritage Sites.

Pictures

References

External links

 Official website 
 Barumini Sistema Cultura Foundation 
 Museum of Barumini's History

Cities and towns in Sardinia